Kate Armstrong may refer to:
 Kate Armstrong (artist), Canadian artist, writer and curator
 Kate Armstrong (memoirist) (born 1962), Canadian author